Sande Muhamed Kizito (born 17 October 1974) is a Ugandan light flyweight boxer. He represented his native African country at the 2000 Summer Olympics in Sydney, Australia, where he was defeated in the first round by Lithuania's Ivanas Stapovičius. Nicknamed "Sunday" he won the gold medal in the men's light flyweight (– 48 kg) division at the 1999 All-Africa Games.

References
 sports-reference

1974 births
Living people
Ugandan Muslims
Light-flyweight boxers
Boxers at the 2000 Summer Olympics
Olympic boxers of Uganda
Ugandan male boxers
African Games gold medalists for Uganda
African Games medalists in boxing
Competitors at the 1999 All-Africa Games